Peqin District was one of the 36 districts of Albania, which were dissolved in July 2000 and replaced by 12 newly created counties. It is in the centre of the country, and its capital was the town of Peqin.

There are two historical structures that are a reminder to the antiquity of the District of Peqin (which is the modern name of the district). First is the Via Egnatia, which passes through the middle of the district where its capital Peqin is located. Second is the castle (Castle Klaudiana) of the district also located at the center Peqin. As for the landscape of the capital, it is located in the valley of the river Shkumbin which has a wide base and runs through Elbasan County emptying into the Adriatic Sea near Divjakë (Fier County).

Administrative divisions
The district consisted of the following municipalities:
Gjoçaj
Karinë
PajovëPeqinPërparim
ShezëNote: - urban municipalities in bold'

References

External links 
 Pegini Online! Lajme Filma Foto Video Shqip 2010 2011

Districts of Albania
Geography of Elbasan County